"It's All About You (Not About Me)" is the first single from Tracie Spencer's third album, Tracie. The single was released on May 25, 1999. It was written by Heavynn, Karlin, and Schack. This was Spencer's first single since "Love Me" in 1992.  A remix version features Black Thought from The Roots.

Chart information
"It's All About You (Not About Me)" was a successful comeback single for Spencer, hitting #6 on the Hot R&B/Hip-Hop Singles & Tracks chart and #18 on the Billboard Hot 100.

Music video
The music video was directed by Francis Lawrence.

Weekly charts

References

1999 songs
Tracie Spencer songs
Music videos directed by Francis Lawrence
Songs written by Soulshock
1999 singles
Capitol Records singles
Songs written by Kenneth Karlin
Song recordings produced by Soulshock and Karlin